Azita Moguie (born November 22, 1965, in Tehran, Iran) is an Iranian Director , Producer , Production Manager . She start her directing career with the film "Tragedy" .
The second film she directed was "Ideh Asli"
Azita Moguie was also line producer in Son of Adam Daughter of Eve (2010).

Career 
 Ideh Asli
 Vaghti Bargashtam
 Hekayat Asheghi
 Tragedy
 Farzand 4om
 Adam kosh
 En-ekas
 Pesare Adam - Dokhatre Hava
 Zane Dovom
 Chocolate
 Hezaran Zan Mesle Man
 Dasthaye Aloode
 Eshgh 2+
 Saghar

References

External links 
Azita Moguie On Instagram
Azita Moguie  On IMDb
Azita Moguie  On   Soureh Cinema

Living people
1965 births
Iranian film actresses
Iranian women film directors